Sir Lynden Oscar Pindling, NH, KCMG, PC, JP (22 March 193026 August 2000) was a Bahamian politician who is regarded as the "Father of the Nation" of the Bahamas, having led it to majority rule on 10 January 1967 and to independence on 10 July 1973.  He served as the first black premier of the Colony of the Bahama Islands from 1967 to 1969 and as Prime Minister of the Bahamas from 1969 to 1992. He was leader of the Progressive Liberal Party (PLP) from 1956 to 1997 when he resigned from public life under scandal.

Pindling won an unbroken string of general elections until 1992, when the PLP lost to the Free National Movement (FNM) led by Hubert Alexander Ingraham. He conceded defeat with the words: "the people of this great little democracy have spoken in a most dignified and eloquent manner (and) the voice of the people, is the voice of God".

Pindling was sworn in as a member of Her Majesty's Most Honourable Privy Council (PC) in 1976, and he was appointed Knight Commander of the Order of St. Michael and St. George (KCMG) in 1982. In 2018, he was posthumously awarded the Bahamian Order of National Hero (NH).

Early life and family
Pindling was born on 22 March 1930 to Arnold and Viola Pindling in his grandfather's home in Mason's Addition, Nassau, Bahamas. Pindling's father was a native of Jamaica who had earlier immigrated to The Bahamas to join the Royal Bahamas Police Force as a constable. His father was also a shopkeeper, occasional farmer, raiser of racehorses and a businessman. Pindling's mother Viola Pindling whose maiden name was Bain was also not from New Providence but hailed from the family island Acklins which she left as a child. Sir Lynden Pindling was an only child.

As a young boy Pindling worked for his father's small grocery store which was attached to their sizeable home in East Street, New Providence. He became chief delivery boy using the handlebars of his bike to make drop-offs in neighbouring areas. Earlier, this post had belonged to his then neighbour Sidney Poitier, later Bahamian actor, award winner, film director, author, and diplomat.

Education 
Pindling's parents wanted the best possible education available to him that they could afford. This led to Pindling transferring schools frequently in his earlier years. His primary school education he attained first at Eastern Primary School then located on School Lane, between Shirley and Dowdeswell Street. He also spent some time at a Seventh-day Adventist Primary school at his mother behest.

Then between the ages seven and nine, Pindling attended all three of the government's junior schools. He spent approximately one year in each. They were Eastern Junior on Bay Street, Southern Junior on Wulff Road and Western Junior on the corner of Meeting Street and Hospital Lane. He also got his BTE(Been to England)

He then spent three years at Western Senior School from 1940–43. While there the head teacher was musician and composer of the Bahamian National anthem, Timothy Gibson whom Pindling also later took piano lessons from. Pindling also participated in sports like track and field and softball.

In the summer of 1943, Pindling along with hundreds of children from all over The Bahamas took examinations for enrolment in then prestigious Government High School (GHS). He was one of twenty who won a place. He graduated from GHS in '46.

Pindling went on to study at King's College, University of London (1948–52), from which he received a law degree. He was admitted to the Middle Temple on 12 October 1948 and was Called to the Bar on 10 February 1953.

Political career

By the end of 1953, Pindling had joined the newly formed Progressive Liberal Party (PLP) as its legal advisor. In 1956, he became Parliamentary Leader when the PLP Chairman and de facto leader, Henry Taylor (later Sir Henry Taylor), was defeated in the 1956 general election. Pindling was elected the party's Parliamentary Leader over the dynamic and popular labour leader Randol Fawkes (later Sir Randol).

On 5 May 1956, Pindling married Marguerite McKenzie, of Long Bay Cays in Andros, at St Ann's Parish on Fox Hill Road in Nassau. The following month, he successfully contested Nassau's Southern District constituency in the 1956 General Election. Thereafter, he would win successive elections to the House of Assembly in 1962, 1967, 1972, 1977, 1982, 1987, 1992 and 1997.

On 27 April 1965 (a day known in Bahamian history as "Black Tuesday") Pindling delivered a speech the House of Assembly. In a dramatic turn of events, Pindling ended his speech by taking the Speaker's Mace and in a dramatic power-to-the-people gesture throwing it out of a window onto the street.

He was elected prime minister in 1967 on a platform that included hostility to gambling, corruption and the Bay Street Boys' mob connections. On 10 January 1967, the PLP and the governing United Bahamian Party (led by Sir Roland Symonette) each won 18 seats in the Assembly. Randol Fawkes (the lone Labour MP) voted to sit with the PLP, and Sir Alvin Braynen, an independent MP, agreed to become Speaker, enabling Pindling to form the first black government in Bahamian history.

Pindling went on to lead Bahamians to independence from Great Britain on 10 July 1973 amid controversy. He introduced social security measures in the form of the National Insurance Scheme, and the formation of the College of The Bahamas, the Royal Bahamas Defence Force, among many others.

Pindling held the additional portfolio of Minister of Finance from 1984 to 1990.

Corruption claims

In 1966–67, on the urging of concerned Bahamians, the British government sent a Royal Commission of Inquiry to Nassau to investigate charges of widespread corruption in the Bahamian political system. The four-man commission was headed by Sir Ranulph Bacon, who had recently retired as deputy commander of Scotland Yard. The commission reported that the United Bahamian Party, previously in government, had been a front for mob-affiliated American casino interests, and that the former Premier, Sir Roland Symonette, and the influential Tourism Minister, Sir Stafford Sands, and some others, all received large payments from the casino and resort businesses they had permitted to operate. The commission also found, however, that Lynden Pindling, during his campaign, had been funded and aided by U.S. casino operator Michael McLaney in the expectation that Pindling would permit McLaney to operate in the islands. Because of the report, Pindling broke his link with McLaney, but was not himself prosecuted. Certain prominent mob figures, including Dino Cellini, were exiled from Bahamas, but the casino operations continued. Pindling told the commission that U.S. interests had first approached him with evidence to implicate the UBP in corruption, which led to the royal commission.

In 1973, during a U.S. Senate subcommittee investigation of corrupt offshore finances, Mob elements accused Mike McLaney and his associate Elliott Roosevelt of having offered a contract to kill Pindling for reneging on the deal. This plot was discredited, but new elements of the control of the Miami Beach-based, Meyer Lansky-led syndicate over Bahamian business and politics emerged, as well as details of Mr. McLaney's dealings with Pindling, which included cash, aircraft, boats, and a campaign headquarters on Bay Street.

In 1983, a report entitled The Bahamas: A Nation For Sale by investigative television journalist Brian Ross was aired on NBC in the United States. The report claimed Pindling and his government accepted bribes from Colombian drug smugglers, particularly the notorious Carlos Lehder, co-founder of the Medellín Cartel, in exchange for allowing the smugglers to use the Bahamas as a transshipment point to smuggle Colombian cocaine into the US. Through murder and extortion, Lehder had gained complete control over the Norman's Cay in Exuma, which became the chief base for smuggling cocaine into the United States.

Lehder boasted to the Colombian media about his involvement in drug trafficking at Norman's Cay and about giving hundreds of thousands of dollars in payoffs to the ruling Progressive Liberal Party, but Pindling vigorously denied the accusations, and made a testy appearance on NBC to rebut them. However, the public outcry led to the creation in 1983 of the Royal Commission of Inquiry into Drug Trafficking and Government Corruption in the Bahamas.

A review of Pindling's personal finances by the Commission found that he had spent eight times his reported total earnings from 1977 to 1984. According to the Inquiry: "The prime minister and Lady Pindling have received at least $57.3 million in cash. Explanations for some of these deposits were given... but could not be verified."

The New York Times is quoted saying "Sir Lynden spent much of his time working to improve the reputation of his country, but became vulnerable to charges of corruption in 1984, when an official commission set up to investigate drug trafficking in the Bahamas found wide evidence of official corruption in his cabinet and the Bahamian police. The commission eventually cleared Sir Lynden of any wrongdoing, but said that he and his wife had at least $3.5 million in bank deposits that could not be accounted for.

At the 1987 trial of Carlos Lehder, a founder of the Medellin cocaine cartel in Colombia, prosecutors charged that Mr. Lehder and other drug traffickers had paid at least $5 million to Sir Lynden for permission to use the Bahamas as a shipment point for cocaine and marijuana bound for the United States."

It is an indication of the level of Pindling's popularity in the Bahamas at the time that, despite the scandalous claims made against him in the US media, he never felt the need to resign or call an early election. Even with the commission's report fresh in voters' minds, he led his party to another election victory in 1987.

However, in 1992 the opposition Free National Movement (formed by anti-Pindling factions in 1970) bested the PLP in the General Election, even though Pindling retained his South Andros seat. The FNM was formed in 1971 by a union of the so-called "Free-PLP" and the United Bahamian Party. The Free-PLP were a breakaway group of eight MPs from the then governing Progressive Liberal Party. This group, which was known as the "Dissident Eight," led by the popular Sir Cecil Wallace-Whitfield.

After Pindling's defeat in the August 1992 elections, new Prime Minister Hubert Ingraham "strongly rejected the idea that Sir Lynden or any member of his Government should be extradited to the United States to face possible charges. Witnesses in the trials of both Carlos Lehder, a founder of the Medellin drug cartel in Colombia, and Gen. Manuel Antonio Noriega, the deposed Panamanian dictator, testified to payoffs to Sir Lynden, and some United States officials have long recommended that he be indicted on drug-trafficking charges."

The FNM won a second landslide victory in 1997, and Pindling retired from politics shortly afterward. He was succeeded by Perry Christie.

Death 
In early 1996, Pindling began showing signs of occasional tiredness and other symptoms. His diagnosis was early stages of prostate cancer. He then underwent a ten-week course of radiation treatment at Johns Hopkins Hospital Johns Hopkins Oncology Center in Baltimore. Pindling was later given a clean bill of health by his doctors and returned to his post-Prime Minister work as lawyer.

On his final visit to Johns Hopkins in early July 2000, Pindling's prognosis was fatal, and the cancer had spread to his bones. There was nothing further the doctors could do but offer medication to assist in suppressing the pain.

At his home on Skyline Drive, New Providence, on a Friday evening, Pindling, surrounded by ministers and family, was in his final hours. Before he slipped into a coma his last words were the recitation of the 23rd Psalm to his wife. Shortly after midnight, he went into cardiac arrest, and he was pronounced dead at 12:20 am on Saturday, 26 August 2000, at age 70.

Following his death, 10 days of official mourning were declared nationwide. On 29 August, Parliament met, and then Prime Minister Hubert Ingraham and others paid public tribute. Two days later, all members of The Bahamas Bar did the same in a special session of the Supreme Court.

Pindling's body was displayed in the House of Assembly on Rawson Square, for public viewing for four days, beginning early in the morning on Thursday, 31 August.

On 4 September, a full state funeral was held at the Church of God of Prophecy led by a long procession, with the Royal Bahamas Police Force Band at its front and the Royal Bahamas Defence Force Royal Bahamas Defense Force Band at its rear. His body was finally laid to rest at St Agnes Cemetery on Nassau Street in a mausoleum.

His widow, Dame Marguerite Pindling, was until June 2019 the Governor-General of The Bahamas.

Personal life
Pindling and Dame Marguerite Pindling were married from 1956 until Pindling's death in 2000. They had four children together.

Legacy 

In 2006, Nassau International Airport was renamed Lynden Pindling International Airport in his honour.

He is also depicted on the one dollar note.

References

External links
Progressive Liberal Party web page 
Tony Thorndike, "Obituary", The Guardian (London), 28 August 2000.
Jayson Blair, "Lynden Pindling, 70, Who Led the Bahamas to Independence", The New York Times, 28 August 2000.

|-

|-

1930 births
2000 deaths
Deaths from prostate cancer
Bahamian Seventh-day Adventists
Knights Commander of the Order of St Michael and St George
Members of the Privy Council of the United Kingdom
Finance ministers of the Bahamas
Prime Ministers of the Bahamas
Alumni of King's College London
Progressive Liberal Party politicians
People from Nassau, Bahamas
Bahamian people of Jamaican descent
Deaths from cancer in the Bahamas
20th-century Bahamian politicians